Stenobatyle gracilis is a species of beetle in the family Cerambycidae. It was described by Chemsak in 1980.

References

Trachyderini
Beetles described in 1980